and  are 2009 remakes of the 1999 Game Boy Color role-playing video games Pokémon Gold and Silver, also including features from Pokémon Crystal. The games are part of the fourth generation of the Pokémon video game series and were developed by Game Freak, published by The Pokémon Company and Nintendo for the Nintendo DS. In commemoration of the 10th anniversary of Gold and Silver, the games were released in Japan on September 12, 2009, and were later released in other regions during March 2010.

HeartGold and SoulSilver take place in the Johto and Kanto region of the franchise's fictional universe, which features special creatures called Pokémon. The basic goal of the game is to become the best Pokémon trainer in both the Johto and Kanto regions, which is done by raising and cataloging Pokémon and defeating other trainers.

Game director Shigeki Morimoto aimed to respect the feelings of those who played the previous games, while also ensuring that it felt like a new game to those that were introduced to the series in more recent years. The games have received positive reviews from critics, and as of March 2014, the games' combined sales have reached 12.72 million, making the two games combined the eighth best-selling DS video games of all time.

Gameplay

Pokémon HeartGold and SoulSilver are role-playing video games with adventure elements. The basic mechanics of the games are largely the same as their predecessors'. As with all Pokémon games for handheld consoles, gameplay is viewed from a third-person overhead perspective, and consists of three basic screens: a field map, in which the player navigates the main character; a battle screen; and the menu, in which the player configures their party, items, or gameplay settings. The player begins the game with one Pokémon and can capture more using Poké Balls.

When the player encounters a wild Pokémon or is challenged by a trainer to a battle, the screen switches to a turn-based battle screen where the Pokémon fight. During battle, the player may use a move, use an item, switch the active Pokémon, or flee. Fleeing is not an option during battles against trainers. Pokémon have hit points (HP), which is displayed during battles; when a Pokémon's HP is reduced to zero, it faints and cannot battle unless taken to a Pokémon Center or healed or revived with a Pokémon skill or an item, typically a 'revive' medicine. If the player's Pokémon defeats the opposing Pokémon (causes it to faint), it receives experience points. After accumulating enough experience points, it will level up; most Pokémon evolve into a new species of Pokémon when they reach a certain level, or when certain conditions are met, such as how much a Pokémon statistically 'likes' its trainer.

New features

In HeartGold and SoulSilver, the first Pokémon in the player's party can follow them in the overworld, echoing a mechanic in Pokémon Yellow where Pikachu follows the player. This mechanic was also used in a limited fashion in Pokémon Diamond, Pearl, and Platinum when the player is in Amity Park with a "cute" Pokémon. The player may talk to the Pokémon to see or check on how that Pokémon is feeling, and occasionally it may pick up items. Additionally, a pedometer was bundled with each copy of the games called a "Pokéwalker", which allows players to transfer Pokémon from the game into the device and walk around with them, earning "watts" in the process, which can be exchanged for in-game rewards.

A new minigame called the Pokéathlon uses the Nintendo DS touchscreen and allows Pokémon to compete in events such as hurdling. The Japanese versions retain slot machines found in previous games, while the international releases of the titles replace the slot machines with a new game called "Voltorb Flip", described as a cross between Minesweeper and Picross. Another new item, the GB Sounds, changes the background music to the original chiptune music from Pokémon Gold and Silver.

Connectivity to other devices
HeartGold and SoulSilver can access the Nintendo Wi-Fi Connection (since discontinued) to trade, battle, and interact with other players of these games, as well as players of Pokémon Diamond, Pearl, and Platinum. After completing a special Wi-Fi mission download on Pokémon Ranger: Guardian Signs, the player can send a Deoxys to HeartGold and SoulSilver.

Setting and story

Similar to Pokémon Gold and Silver, Pokémon HeartGold and SoulSilver take place in the Johto and Kanto regions of the franchise's fictional universe. The universe centers on the existence of creatures, called Pokémon, with special abilities. The silent protagonist is a young Pokémon trainer who lives in a small town referred to as New Bark Town. At the beginning of the games, the player chooses either a Chikorita, Cyndaquil, or Totodile as their starter Pokémon from Professor Elm. After performing a delivery for the professor and obtaining a Pokédex from Professor Oak, he decides to let the player keep the Pokémon and start them on a journey.

The goal of the game is to become the best trainer in Johto and Kanto, which is done by raising Pokémon, completing a catalogue of Pokémon called a Pokédex, defeating the eight Gym Leaders in Johto for Gym Badges, challenging the best trainers in the region known as the Elite Four and the Champion, and then subsequently defeating the eight Gym Leaders in the Kanto region. Finally, the player may face off against Red atop Mt. Silver, who serves as the game's final boss.

Throughout the game, the player will battle against members of Team Rocket, a criminal organization originally from Kanto. They were originally defeated by the protagonist of Pokémon FireRed and LeafGreen, and have attempted to come back as an organization, while awaiting the return of their leader, Giovanni. To attempt to contact him, they take over the radio tower and broadcast a message calling out to him.

While being the remakes of Gold  and Silver, the games tie in plot elements of Crystal as well, such as the added emphasis on Suicune over the other legendary beasts, as well as the post-ending Battle Frontier; in Crystal, only the Battle Tower was available. Additionally, Johto and Kanto were given Generation IV features such as the Pal Park.

During certain points in the game, the player's rival will battle the protagonist in a test of skills. Additionally, the player will encounter Kimono Girls, who ask the player to do small favors—such as defeating a Team Rocket grunt—throughout the Johto region. After battling all of them in a row, they proceed to the area where the player encounters the game's legendary Pokémon mascot, Ho-Oh in HeartGold and Lugia in SoulSilver, and perform a dance to summon them. As per the originals, the other legendary Pokémon can be obtained later on.

Development
HeartGold and SoulSilver were released in 2009, ten years after Gold and Silvers initial release for the Game Boy Color. Shigeki Morimoto, the games' director, commented on the development of the remakes: "The first thing that I knew I needed to bear in mind was to respect the feelings of those people who'd played Gold and Silver ten years before. I think that players have very strong memories of the game, so they'd think things like 'Ah, this trainer is still strong' and 'If I do this here, this is going to happen'. I knew I needed to respect these feelings." However, Morimoto also felt he needed to make sure that the games would feel as new games to those who began playing Pokémon in recent years on the Game Boy Advance or the Nintendo DS. An in-game author surrogate of Game Freak's President in Celadon City states that the team strove to make a game that would appeal to players with fond memories without "redoing the same thing". He also states that making the game was a "rewarding challenge". On the differences between the remakes and the originals and how the names bore out of that, Morimoto said "With HeartGold and SoulSilver, the way in which trainers and Pokémon relate has become a major theme and this has been added to the story. We came up with the titles HeartGold and SoulSilver as we decided these were appropriate to express this theme." HeartGold and SoulSilver introduced many new features that were absent in the original Gold and Silver, several of which came from the previously released Nintendo DS Pokémon games, Diamond, Pearl, and Platinum.

Release and promotion
Rumors that Nintendo planned to remake Pokémon Gold and Silver started circulating in early May 2009 after the Japanese television show Pokémon Sunday ended by announcing a "world-exclusive first announcement" that would be made on its next show. Kris Pigna of 1UP.com speculated that this alluded to a possible remake of Gold and Silver for the Nintendo DS, due to gold and silver disco balls hanging in the background. Pigna further reasoned that this would be consistent with the previously released titles Pokémon FireRed and LeafGreen which were enhanced remakes of the original Pokémon Red and Blue. Several days later, Nintendo officially confirmed that Gold and Silver were being remade as HeartGold and SoulSilver and released their official logos. It was also announced that the games would contain numerous updates, although they declined to reveal any specifics. The games were released for the Nintendo DS on September 12, 2009 in Japan to coincide with the tenth anniversary of the original Gold and Silver release. Junichi Masuda stated on his blog that "we, Game Freak have spent long and firm time developing above two titles", and that "'Pokémon Gold & Silver' will be back with far more excitement."

At the 2009 Pokémon World Championships, Nintendo stated that HeartGold and SoulSilver would be released in North America between the months of January and March, Europe sometime around May and June, and Australia in April. "Announcing these much-anticipated game launches at The Pokémon World Championships allows us to give the news directly to the legions of fans who represent the true heart and soul of Pokémon," a spokesperson said. As the games approached release, from February 27 to March 13, 2010, North American video game retailer GameStop hosted a promotion in which players of Pokémon Diamond, Pearl, or Platinum could use the games' "Mystery Gift" function to download a free Jirachi Pokémon to their game. A "Pikachu-colored Pichu" could be downloaded using Wi-Fi that, when taken to the Ilex Forest in-game, unlocked a "Spiky-eared Pichu". The games were released in North America on March 14, 2010, in Australia on March 25, 2010, and in Europe on March 26, 2010 except in the Netherlands and Dutch speaking Belgium where they released on April 2, 2010.

Audio
 a three-disc soundtrack featuring music scored by Junichi Masuda, Go Ichinose, Hitomi Sato, Shota Kageyama, and Takuto Kitsuta, was released in Japan on October 28, 2009.

Reception

Pre-release
In response to the news confirming the development of HeartGold and SoulSilver, fans posted their reactions and commentary on the Internet. In particular, IGN editor Jack DeVries reasoned that the primary reason for the updated games was to be compatible with Pokémon Diamond and Pearl, allowing players to collect old Pokémon species that were previously unobtainable in the new games. He also expressed skepticism that the new titles could match the quality of the originals; stating, "For me, Gold and Silver were amazing because they introduced so many new features that have since become standards for the series. It was the first, and only, time the Pokémon games have made such a significant expansion. These days we're lucky if we get a new feature that invisibly changes the strategic elements of the game." He reminisced over the qualities that made Gold and Silver truly unique, including the full color support, internal clock, Pokémon breeding, and PokéGear. Several months later, after DeVries had played through some of the game, he wrote, "so far I like what I see, even if it all feels very familiar and formulaic at this point."

Critical response

The games' reception has been positive, holding an aggregate score of 87 on Metacritic. The titles are among the top 20 rated DS games on the site. Japanese gaming magazine Famitsu awarded the games a composite score of 37 out of 40 based on four individual reviews, of which the ratings were 9, 10, 9, and 9. The reviewers praised the games for retaining much of the quality that drew them to the original Gold and Silver. The only drawback mentioned was that the games brought "no major surprises". Nintendo Power gave the games one of the highest scores, remarking on its replay value though criticizing shortly about no improvement in graphic animation for Pokémon sprites. Official Nintendo Magazine stated that they were the best Pokémon games yet. Game Informers Annette Gonzalez stated "Even though the classic Pokémon formula still works as evidenced by HeartGold. I can’t help but hope for a new Pokémon title that breaks some new ground."

IGNs Craig Harris said that the titles were "like a gap filler to make the wait for a new Pokémon game just a little more bearable". Jim Sterling of Destructoid stated, "While it is, at its core, the same game that you've played many years ago, it still manages to feel new and the updated features bolster the original experience in a manner that never intrudes and only enhances". 1UP.coms Justin Haywald stated that "HeartGold and SoulSilver is easily the best Pokémon game yet". VideoGamer.com reviewer Jamin Smith said, "With HeartGold and SoulSilver the Pokémon series has reached a point where it can't get any better." Eurogamers Keza MacDonald gave the games a 9/10, stating "They combine everything that was best about the older Pokémon games", citing the Pokémon designs and improved graphics and battle system. GamePros McKinley Noble stated that "it's clear that this is a perfect experience for both old-school trainers and the newest generation of Pokémon fans." GameZones Cliff Bakehorn III said, "There is not a doubt in my mind: Pokémon HeartGold and SoulSilver are the pinnacle of the entire series." Nathan Meunier of GameSpot gave the games one of the lower scores, criticizing them for a lack of innovation. GamesRadar attributed the game's success to being a remake of classic games.

HeartGold and SoulSilver won the Golden Joystick Award for Portable Game of the Year in 2010, the first Golden Joystick Award win for the series.

Sales
In Japan, the games sold over 1.48 million units within the first two days of release, topping the Japanese sales chart that week. Within two weeks, the games had sold a combined total of over 2.00 million units. By December 18, 2009, the games' Japanese sales totals had surpassed 3.22 million. In Australia, over 50,000  units sold in one week. In the United States, the games managed collective sales of 1.73 million in their first month, with the SoulSilver version selling 1.01 million and HeartGold selling 0.76 million units. The combined sales of the two games made them the highest-selling games of March 2010. By May 6, 2010, the games had sold 8.40 million units worldwide, and the games reached 10 million sales worldwide by the end of July 2010. As of September 2017, the games' combined sales have reached 12.72 million.

Notes

References

External links
  (US)
  

2009 video games
Game Freak games
Japanese role-playing video games
Multiplayer and single-player video games
Video game sequels
Nintendo DS games
Nintendo DS-only games
Nintendo Wi-Fi Connection games
HeartGold and SoulSilver
Role-playing video games
Video game remakes
Video games developed in Japan
Video games featuring protagonists of selectable gender
Video games with alternative versions
Video games scored by Go Ichinose
Video games scored by Junichi Masuda
Video games scored by Shota Kageyama